The following outline is provided as an overview of and topical guide to Malta:

Malta is a small and densely populated sovereign island nation located in the Mediterranean Sea. Malta comprises an archipelago of seven islands, of which the three largest are inhabited. The nation's capital is the 16th century city of Valletta.

Throughout much of its history, Malta has been considered a crucial location due in large part to its position in the Mediterranean Sea. It was held by several ancient cultures including Sicilians, Romans, Phoenicians, Byzantines and others. The island is commonly associated with the Knights of St. John who ruled it. This, along with the historic pseudo-historic and religiously claimed shipwreck of St. Paul on the island, and since the 12th century ingrained a Roman Catholic legacy which is still the official religion in Malta today combined with secular values.

The country's official languages are Maltese and English; the former is the national language and the latter a legacy from Malta's period as a British colony. Malta gained independence in 1964 and is, as of 2017, a member of the Commonwealth of Nations, as well as the European Union, which it joined in 2004.

General reference 

 Pronunciation:  ,  
 Common English country name:  Malta
 Official English country name:  The Republic of Malta
 Common endonym(s): Malta
 Official endonym(s): Repubblika ta' Malta 
 Adjectival(s): Maltese
 Demonym(s): Maltese
 Etymology: Name of Malta
 ISO country codes:  MT, MLT, 470
 ISO region codes:  See ISO 3166-2:MT
 Internet country code top-level domain:  .mt

Geography of Malta 

Geography of Malta
 Malta is: an island country and a European microstate
 Location:
 Northern Hemisphere and Eastern Hemisphere
 Atlantic Ocean
 Mediterranean Sea
 Eurasia (though not on the mainland)
 Europe
 Southern Europe
 Time zone:  Central European Time (UTC+01), Central European Summer Time (UTC+02)
 Extreme points of Malta
 High:  Ta' Dmejrek 
 Low:  Mediterranean Sea 0 m
 Land boundaries:  none
 Coastline:  Mediterranean Sea 252.8 km
 Population of Malta: 493,559 (2019)  - 167th most populous country

 Area of Malta: 316 km2
 Atlas of Malta

Environment of Malta 

 Climate of Malta
 Endemic Maltese wildlife
 Environmental issues in Malta
 Nature reserve
 Renewable energy in Malta
 Geology of Malta
 Protected areas of Malta
 Biosphere reserves in Malta
 National parks of Malta
 Wildlife of Malta
 Flora of Malta
 Fauna of Malta
 Birds of Malta
 Mammals of Malta

Natural geographic features of Malta 
 Coastline of Malta
 Islands of Malta
 Malta
 Gozo
 Comino
 Filfla
 Manoel Island
 St Paul's Island
 Malta Channel
 Valleys of Malta
 World Heritage Sites in Malta

Regions of Malta 

Regions of Malta

Ecoregions of Malta 

Ecoregions in Malta

Administrative divisions of Malta 

Administrative divisions of Malta
 Districts of Malta

Districts of Malta 

Districts of Malta

Municipalities of Malta 

 Capital of Malta: Valletta
 Cities of Malta
 Three Cities

Demography of Malta 

Demographics of Malta

Government and politics of Malta 

Politics of Malta
 Form of government: multi-party representative democratic parliamentary republic
 Capital of Malta: Valletta (de facto)
 Elections in Malta
 Political parties in Malta

Branches of the Republic of Malta 

 Head of state: President of Malta

Executive branch of Malta 

Government of Malta
 Head of Government: Prime Minister of Malta,
 Cabinet of Malta

Legislative branch of Malta 
 Speaker of the House of Representatives of Malta
 House of Representatives of Malta
 Leader of the House of Representatives of Malta
 Leader of the Opposition (Malta)

Judicial branch of Malta 

Judiciary of Malta
 Primus Inter Pares of Judicial Branch: Chief Justice of Malta
 Law Courts and Tribunals of Malta
 Commission for the Administration of Justice of Malta
 Castellania (former courthouse)

Foreign relations of Malta 

Foreign relations of Malta
 Diplomatic missions of Malta

International organization membership 
The Republic of Malta is a member of:

Australia Group
Commonwealth of Nations
Council of Europe (CE)
Economic and Monetary Union (EMU)
Euro-Atlantic Partnership Council (EAPC)
European Bank for Reconstruction and Development (EBRD)
European Investment Bank (EIB)
European Union (EU)
Food and Agriculture Organization (FAO)
International Atomic Energy Agency (IAEA)
International Bank for Reconstruction and Development (IBRD)
International Civil Aviation Organization (ICAO)
International Criminal Court (ICCt)
International Criminal Police Organization (Interpol)
International Federation of Red Cross and Red Crescent Societies (IFRCS)
International Finance Corporation (IFC)
International Fund for Agricultural Development (IFAD)
International Labour Organization (ILO)
International Maritime Organization (IMO)
International Mobile Satellite Organization (IMSO)
International Monetary Fund (IMF)
International Olympic Committee (IOC)
International Organization for Migration (IOM)
International Organization for Standardization (ISO)
International Red Cross and Red Crescent Movement (ICRM)

International Telecommunication Union (ITU)
International Telecommunications Satellite Organization (ITSO)
International Trade Union Confederation (ITUC)
Inter-Parliamentary Union (IPU)
Multilateral Investment Guarantee Agency (MIGA)
Nuclear Suppliers Group (NSG)
Organization for Security and Cooperation in Europe (OSCE)
Organisation for the Prohibition of Chemical Weapons (OPCW)
Partnership for Peace (PFP)
Permanent Court of Arbitration (PCA)
Schengen Convention
United Nations (UN)
United Nations Conference on Trade and Development (UNCTAD)
United Nations Educational, Scientific, and Cultural Organization (UNESCO)
United Nations Industrial Development Organization (UNIDO)
Universal Postal Union (UPU)
World Confederation of Labour (WCL)
World Customs Organization (WCO)
World Federation of Trade Unions (WFTU)
World Health Organization (WHO)
World Intellectual Property Organization (WIPO)
World Meteorological Organization (WMO)
World Tourism Organization (UNWTO)
World Trade Organization (WTO)

Law and order in Malta 

Law of Malta
 Capital punishment in Malta
 Constitution of Malta
 Crime in Malta
 Human rights in Malta
 LGBT rights in Malta
 Freedom of religion in Malta
 Law enforcement in Malta

Military of Malta 

Military of Malta
 Command
 Commander-in-chief: President of Malta
 Prime Minister of Malta
 Chief of Staff: Brigadier of The Armed Forces of Malta
 Armed Forces of Malta
 Army of Malta
 Navy of Malta
 Air Force of Malta
 Special forces of Malta
 Military history of Malta
 Military ranks of Malta

Local government in Malta 

Local government in Malta

History of Malta 

 Military history of Malta
 Monarchs of Malta

Culture of Malta 

Culture of Malta
 Architecture of Malta
 Maltese Baroque architecture
 Cuisine of Malta
 Festivals in Malta
 Languages of Malta
 Maltenglish
 Maltese language
 Media in Malta
 Newspapers in Malta
 Radio stations in Malta
 Television in Malta
 Monuments in Malta
 Museums in Malta
 National symbols of Malta
 Coat of arms of Malta
 Flag of Malta
 National anthem of Malta
 People of Malta
 Prostitution in Malta
 Public holidays in Malta
 Records of Malta
 Religion in Malta
 Christianity in Malta
 Hinduism in Malta
 Islam in Malta
 Judaism in Malta
 Sikhism in Malta
 World Heritage Sites in Malta

Art in Malta 
 Art in Malta
 Cinema of Malta
 List of Maltese artists
 Literature of Malta
 Maltese folklore
 Music of Malta
 Philosophy in Malta
 Theatre in Malta

Sports in Malta 

Sports in Malta
 Football in Malta
 Handball Malta
Malta at the Olympics

Economy and infrastructure of Malta 

Economy of Malta

 Economic rank, by nominal GDP (2007): 125th (one hundred and twenty fifth)
 Agriculture in Malta
 Banking in Malta
 Central Bank of Malta
 Communications in Malta
 Internet in Malta
 Companies of Malta
Currency of Malta: Euro (see also: Euro topics)
Maltese euro coins
Previous currency: Maltese lira 
ISO 4217: EUR
 Energy in Malta
 Energy policy of Malta
 Oil industry in Malta
 Health care in Malta
 Mining in Malta
 Malta Stock Exchange
 Tourism in Malta
 Hotels in Malta
 Museums in Malta
 Visa policy of Malta
 Transport in Malta
 Airports in Malta
 Rail transport in Malta
 Roads in Malta

Education in Malta 

Education in Malta
 University of Malta

See also 

Index of Malta-related articles
List of international rankings
Member state of the Commonwealth of Nations
Member state of the European Union
Member state of the United Nations
Outline of Europe
Outline of geography
WikiProject Malta - Central place for contributing to Malta Articles.

References

External links 

 Malta Environment Press Article Archive

Gov.mtMaltese Government official site.
Diving MaltaAll the dive sites in Malta
 Laws of MaltaA summary of principal laws and glossary of terms.
The Maltese Armed Forces official website
Malta Business Directory Find Maltese Businesses
Laws Of Malta
Malta on Emporis.com
Malta Environment and Planning Authority's GIS Map Server which includes place names and street's layout and names
 The Times of Malta
Official Maltese Tourism website
101 Things to do in Malta an offbeat guide to what to do in Malta and Gozo
Malta Everything about Malta
Malta travel guide 

Malta